Nation Radio Suffolk is an Independent Local radio station owned  and operated by Nation Broadcasting. It broadcasts from Ipswich in Suffolk.

As of December 2022, the station broadcasts to a weekly audience of 27,000, according to RAJAR.

History
The licence for the area had previously been held by Town 102 but Ofcom awarded the licence to Ipswich 102. This had been the first time in its history that Ofcom had not awarded a re-advertised licence to the incumbent broadcaster. Ofcom said that it regarded the station's multiplex holdings as reason why the new operator would be able to support the station: "Ipswich FM’s commitment to broadcasting on the Suffolk DAB multiplex means it would have access to a greater number of potential listeners than the incumbent licensee, which does not, and did not indicate any plans to, broadcast on DAB." The launch of the station was led by Paul Morris, formerly a presenter on SGR-FM and until 2017 the programme director for Town 102, the station Ipswich 102 replaced.

Closure
On 15 October 2020, joint shareholders Nation Broadcasting and Bauer announced that the station had agreed a brand licence to rebrand Ipswich 102 to Greatest Hits Radio East from November 2020. The station will take the local drivetime programme that is currently broadcast on the existing neighbouring network stations, with all other programming being networked from Liverpool & Manchester.

Town 102 became Hits Radio Suffolk on 3 November 2020.

Nation Radio
On 1 October 2022, Nation Broadcasting
has taken back the frequency and 
simulcast Nation Radio UK, except on weekday afternoons between 1pm and 4pm, where the station opts out of network programming, for a localised show, presented by Rob Chandler.

References

External links 
 Nation Radio Suffolk

Radio stations in Suffolk
Ipswich
 Nation Broadcasting
Radio stations established in 2022